Michael Kongehl (19 March 1646 – 1 November 1710) was a German baroque poet.

Life
Kongehl was born in Kreuzburg to the brewer Michael Kongehl and his wife Barbara Marquart. He visited the school in Kreuzburg and Königsberg and started to study Lutheran divinity at the University of Königsberg in 1661. Afterwards Kongehl travelled to Jena and Nürnberg, where he lived for 3 years. Here Kongehl was "crowned" as a poet and named "prutenio" and was a member of the association of poets Pegnesischer Blumenorden. He returned to Königsberg and applied for the succession of Simon Dach as a professor of poetry at the University of Königsberg, but without success. Kongehl worked as a municipal secretary of Kneiphof, became a councilman in 1696 and Mayor of Kneiphof. He died throughout a time of epidemic plague in Königsberg.

Works
Kongehl wrote several popular religious chants like
So bist du nun zugegen, du Heiland aller Welt
So bleibt denoch ein gut Gewissen das schönste kleinod der Welt
Nur frisch hinein, es wird so tief nicht sein

but also secular poetry and dramas
Trauer-Hirten-Spiel, 1674
Der beglückwünschte Doppelsieg des Kaisers, 1675
Die vom Himmel herabgestürmte Himmel-Stürmer, 1675
Das vom ungerathenen Sausewind versuchte u. verfluchte Kriegs-Leben, 1675
Das bedrückte u. wieder erquickte Brandenburg, 1675
Das sterbende Leben, 1676
Surbosia oder geschichtsmächtiges Helden-Gedicht, 1676
Hirtengedicht Auff Das Anmuthseelige u. Freudenvolle Geburts-Fest Des Allergetreuesten Erz-Seelen-Hirten Jesu Christi, 1680
Der unschuldig-beschuldigten Innocenzien Unschuld, e. nachdenkl. Genues. Gedicht in e. Mischspiel, 1680
Die Vom Tod erweckte Phönizia, Eine Anmuthige Sicilian. Geschicht, In e. Misch-Spiel (Tragico-Comoedia), 1682
Belustigung bei der Unlust aus allerhand Geist- u. andern Glückwunschs-Gedichten. J. - Der Verkehrte u. Wiederbekehrte Prinz Tugendhold, 1691
Immergrünender Cypressen-Hayn, 1694
Lust-Quartier, neben den Cypressen-Hayn, 1694
Die unvergleichlich-schöne Princeßin Andromeda, In e. Misch-Spiel (Tragico-Comedia), 1695
Sieg prangender Lorbeer-Hayn, 1700
Eines vortrefflichen Poeten Geist- u. Weltliche Gedichte, 1715.

References

Horst Schulz, "Der Kreis Pr. Eylau", Verden/Aller 1983, p. 767

External links
Picture of Kongehl

1646 births
1710 deaths
German Lutheran hymnwriters
German poets
People from the Duchy of Prussia
University of Königsberg alumni
German-language poets
Baroque writers